is a passenger railway station located in the town of Sakawa, Takaoka District, Kōchi Prefecture, Japan. It is operated by JR Shikoku and has the station number "K11".

Lines

Layout
The station consists of two opposed side platforms serving two tracks. A station building, which is  unstaffed, serves as a waiting room. A level crossing with ramps connects both side platforms.

Adjacent stations

History
At this time the station was operated by Japanese Government Railways, later becoming Japanese National Railways (JNR). With the privatization of JNR on 1 April 1987, control of the station passed to JR Shikoku.

Surrounding area
Kamo Elementary and Junior High School

See also
 List of Railway Stations in Japan

References

External links

 JR Shikoku timetable

Railway stations in Kōchi Prefecture
Railway stations in Japan opened in 1924
Sakawa, Kōchi